In chess, the scholar's mate is the checkmate achieved by the following moves, or similar:

1. e4 e5 
2. Qh5 Nc6 
3. Bc4 Nf6 
4. Qxf7

The same mating pattern may be reached by various move orders. For example, White might play 2.Bc4. In all variations, the basic idea is the same: the queen and bishop combine in a simple , occurring on f7 for White or on f2 for Black.

The scholar's mate is sometimes referred to as the four-move checkmate, although there are other ways for checkmate to occur in four moves.

History
The scholar's mate was named and described in The Royall Game of Chesse-Play, a 1656 text by Francis Beale which adapted the work of the early chess writer Gioachino Greco. The example given above is an adaptation of that reported by Beale.

All of the details are coherent from the modern perspective except for the first moves by each player—if Black's pawn advances only one square, this prevents White's bishop from supporting the white queen to give mate.  Beale's text was an early modern account of the rules and tactics of chess, including concepts such as the ability of a pawn to advance two squares on its first move, the en passant capture, and exchanges.  However, the document treated a then-exotic subject during the early days of printing; consequently the publisher attached a list of errata at the back, following publication.  Thus, the text "one houſe" describing the first move (advancing one square) may have been a mistake.

Avoiding the scholar's mate
Unlike the fool's mate, which rarely occurs at any level, games ending in the scholar's mate are quite common among beginners. It is not difficult to parry, however.

On move 1
After 1.e4, Black can play a semi-open defense instead of 1...e5. Openings such as the French Defense (1...e6) or the Scandinavian Defense (1...d5) render the scholar's mate unviable, while other openings such as the Sicilian Defense (1...c5) make 2.Bc4 a bad move (1.e4 c5 2.Bc4 e6, intending ...d5, gaining  by attacking the c4-bishop and attaining easy ).

On move 3
 
After 1.e4 e5 2.Qh5 Nc6 3.Bc4, the cleanest way to defend against the mate threat is 3...g6. Should White renew the Qxf7 threat with 4.Qf3, Black can easily defend by 4...Nf6 (see diagram), and  the f8-bishop later via fianchetto (...Bg7).

In other openings
Although a quick mate on f7 is almost never seen in play above beginner level, the basic idea underlying it—that f7 and f2, squares defended only by the kings, are weak and therefore good targets for early attack—is the motivating principle behind a number of chess openings. 

After 1.e4 e5 2.Nf3 Nc6 3.Bc4 Nf6 (the Two Knights Defense), White's most popular continuation is 4.Ng5, attacking f7, which is awkward for Black to defend. The Fried Liver Attack even involves a sacrifice of the knight on f7. 
In the Frankenstein–Dracula Variation of the Vienna Game (1.e4 e5 2.Nc3 Nf6 3.Bc4 Nxe4),  threatening a checkmate with 4.Qh5, similar to the scholar's mate, is the only way for White to play for an advantage.
Danvers Opening (1.e4 e5 2.Qh5) and the Napoleon Opening (1.e4 e5 2.Qf3) are both aimed at threatening the scholar's mate on the next move (3.Bc4). Although the Napoleon Opening is never seen in high-level competition, Danvers Opening has occasionally been tried in tournaments by grandmaster Hikaru Nakamura to achieve a practical middlegame position for White.

Other names
Among English speakers, the scholar's mate is also known as schoolboy's mate (which in modern English perhaps better connotes the sense of 'novice' intended by the word scholar's) and Blitzkrieg (German for "lightning war", meaning a quick victory).

The names of the scholar's mate in other languages are as follows:
 in Basque, Catalan, Czech, Dutch, Estonian, Esperanto, French, German, Portuguese, Slovak, Spanish, Turkish: shepherd's mate
 in Czech, Croatian, Danish, German, Hebrew, Hungarian, Polish, Serbian, Slovak, Slovenian: shoemaker's mate
 in Belorussian, Latvian, Lithuanian, Russian, Ukrainian: children's mate
 in Bosnian, Danish, Finnish, Macedonian, Norwegian, Serbian, Swedish: school mate
 in Arabic, Greek, Persian: Napoleon's mate (plan, trap, move)
 in Italian: barber's mate

See also
Checkmate pattern
Fool's mate
List of chess traps

References

Bibliography

Chess checkmates
Chess terminology